Mosaic stitch is the simplest diagonal stitch used in needlepoint. 

It is built up of cells of three stitches two short stitches flanking one long one. It is similar to Cushion stitch (or Scotch stitch) but has only 3 diagonals per group rather than five. In Reversed Mosaic stitch, alternate cells run in opposite diagonals to form a chequerboard effect.

References

 Gordon, Jill Take Up Needlepoint 1994 London, Merehurst 

Embroidery stitches

Needlework